Yisrael Kargman (born 23 December 1906, died 17 November 1987) was an Israeli politician who served as a member of the Knesset for Mapai and its successors between 1957 and 1977.

Biography
Born in Berdychiv in the Russian Empire (today in Ukraine), Kargman was a member of the HeHalutz movement, which was illegal during the Soviet era. He was exiled to Siberia in 1925, where he remained until making aliyah to Mandatory Palestine in 1929.

A member of Mapai, he was on the party's list for the 1955 elections. Although he failed to win a seat, he entered the Knesset on 8 October 1956 as a replacement for Zalman Shazar. He retained his seat in elections in 1959, 1961, 1965, 1969 and 1973, by which time Mapai had merged into the Labor Party and formed the Alignment alliance. He lost his seat in the 1977 elections, which saw the Alignment lose 17 of its 49 seats.

He died in 1987 at the age of 80.

References

External links

1906 births
1987 deaths
20th-century Israeli Jews
Ukrainian Jews
Ukrainian emigrants to Israel
People from Berdychiv
Soviet emigrants to Mandatory Palestine
Israeli Labor Party politicians
Mapai politicians
Alignment (Israel) politicians
Members of the 3rd Knesset (1955–1959)
Members of the 4th Knesset (1959–1961)
Members of the 5th Knesset (1961–1965)
Members of the 6th Knesset (1965–1969)
Members of the 7th Knesset (1969–1974)
Members of the 8th Knesset (1974–1977)